There have been several ships named Hope:

Ships named for the virtue/emotion
Numerous vessels have been named Hope for the emotion or virtue Hope:

  was an American brig or sloop that made two voyages in the slave trade.
  was built at Liverpool, though it is not clear under what name. She first appeared in Lloyd's Register in 1786 as a Greenland whaler. From 1789 on she was a Southern Fishery whaler. As such she made five whaling voyages to Africa or the South Pacific. On the fifth she captured . Hope was last listed in 1798.
  was an American brigantine that made a maritime fur trade voyage under Captain Joseph Ingraham.
  was launched in 1792 at Plymouth. In 1793 She had a successful cruise as a privateer, capturing or recapturing some five vessels. On her return to England her owners sold her and she became the Spanish packet Esperanza, sailing between England and Spain. With the outbreak of war between Britain and Spain in 1796 Esperanza disappeared from the registers.
  was launched on the Thames River. She made seven voyages for the British East India Company (EIC) before she was sold for breaking up in 1816. She was one of the East Indiamen at the battle of Pulo Aura.
  was the mercantile Hope that the Royal Navy purchased at Leith in 1797. It initially named her GB No.41, and then renamed her HMS Rattler. The Navy sold her in 1802. She returned to the name Hope and became a merchantman trading with Hamburg, Gibraltar, and lastly, Cowes. She was last listed in 1816.
  was a small ship launched in 1802. She wrecked at Port Stephens, New South Wales, Australia in 1817.
  was launched at Peterhead in 1802. She was a whaler in the British northern whale fishery for her entire career. She was lost in July 1830.
  was launched at Calcutta. She made one voyage for the British East India Company (EIC). She continued to trade around India until a French frigate captured her in 1808. She apparently returned to English hands and was renamed Madras Merchant. She was then sold in 1816 at Manila.
  is an oyster sloop that was completed in 1948. It is believed to be the last sail-powered oystering vessel built on the Long Island Sound.
  was a hospital ship operated by Project HOPE. Hope was originally a US Navy hospital ship, .  Consolation was donated to Project Hope in 1958, and under her new name served from 1960 until her retirement in 1974.
  – One of 16 vessels of that name that served the Royal Navy
  - one of two vessels of that name that served the United States Navy

Other ships named Hope
 
 , lead ship of the Bob Hope-class vehicle cargo ships

See also
  was a Dutch sailing ship in service since 1597 that sank in 1605 during a storm in the Pacific Ocean. She was travelling from Hawaii to Japan under the command of Admiral Jacques Mahu.
 Hopeship (1994 novel) science fiction novel by Simon Lang

Ship names